The Punta Merciantaira (in Italian ) or Grand Glaiza (in French) is a 3,293 metres high mountain of the Cottian Alps.

Geography 
The peak is located on the French-Italian border between the Metropolitan City of Turin (Piedmont) and the French department of Hautes-Alpes (Provence-Alpes-Côte-d'Azur). It belongs to the Main chain of the Alps. Administratively the mountain is part of the Italian comune of Cesana Torinese (north face) and the French commune of Cervières.

SOIUSA classification 
According to SOIUSA (International Standardized Mountain Subdivision of the Alps) the mountain can be classified in the following way:
 main part = Western Alps
 major sector =  South Western Alps
 section = Cottian Alps
 subsection = Central Cottian Alps
 supergroup = 	Catena Bric Froid-Rochebrune-Beal Traversier
 group = Gruppo Ramière-Merciantaira
 subgroup = Sottogruppo del Merciantaira
 code = I/A-4.II-B.4.b

Access to the summit 

The summit of the Grand Glaiza can be easily accessed starting from Les Fonts (commune of Cervières) in less than 4 hours' walk following a waymarked foothpath. The easiest route from the Italian side, starting from Grange di Thuras (Cesana Torinese), is longer and requires a good hiking experience.

References

Maps
 Italian official cartography (Istituto Geografico Militare - IGM); on-line version: www.pcn.minambiente.it
 French  official cartography (Institut géographique national - IGN); on-line version:  www.geoportail.fr
 Istituto Geografico Centrale - Carta dei sentieri e dei rifugi scala 1:50.000 n. 1 Valli di Susa Chisone e Germanasca ''

Related articles 
 France–Italy border

External links

 

Merciantaira
Grand Glaiza
Merciantaira
Merciantaira
France–Italy border
Merciantaira
Grand Glaiza